The London Nautical School (LNS) is an 11–18 foundation secondary school for boys and mixed sixth form in Blackfriars, Greater London, England. It was established in 1915.

History 
The London Nautical School was established in 1915 in response to the Titanic disaster and subsequent Government inquiry. In 1990, it became one of the country's first 11–18 comprehensive secondary schools for boys to be awarded grant-maintained status. In September 1999, it became a foundation school and was awarded Sports College status in 2003.

Curriculum 
The school's academic programme is supported by close associations with the Maritime industry and local football academy offering a range of courses and qualifications in support of its curriculum. The school maintains its own fleet of boats on the River Thames and hosts its own Sea Cadet Unit.

Notable alumni 
 Marcus Bettinelli, professional footballer
 John Bostock, professional footballer
 Abdul Buhari, athlete
 Jim Dowd, politician
 Stewart Jackson, politician and adviser
 Edward Lister, political strategist
 Reiss Nelson, professional footballer
 Jeff Probyn, rugby union player
 Mark Stanhope, retired Royal Navy officer
 John Wardle, bass guitarist, singer, poet and composer
 Gregg Wallace, media personality, presenter, writer, and former grocer

References

External links 
 

Foundation schools in the London Borough of Lambeth
Secondary schools in the London Borough of Lambeth
Grade II listed buildings in the London Borough of Lambeth
Educational institutions established in 1915
1915 establishments in England